Slideride is an album by trombonists Ray Anderson, Craig Harris, George Lewis, and Gary Valente which was released on the hat ART label in 1995.

Reception

The Allmusic review by Scott Yanow stated "On this unusual date, the instrumentation is simply four trombones ... The performances are mostly pretty concise with free sections segueing logically into more arranged sections. No one trombonist emerges as the main star; in fact there is no attempt in the liner notes to point out who plays what although Anderson's high notes give him away at times. The adventurous music is clearly not for everyone but it generally works and one does not miss other instruments. Worth hearing".

Track listing
All compositions by George Lewis except where noted
 "Sweeps" – 4:11
 "Miles" (Craig Harris) – 5:53
 "Again Raven" (Ray Anderson) – 5:48
 "Lotus Blossom" (Billy Strayhorn) – 3:53
 "The Jeep Is Jumping" (Duke Ellington, Johnny Hodges) – 2:22
 "Shadowgraph 5" – 7:40
 "Shadow Catchers" (Harris) – 7:55
 "Unison" – 8:03
 "Four Some" (Anderson) – 7:05
 "Oclupaca" (Ellington) – 6:01
 "In Time Out" (Gary Valente) – 4:52

Personnel
 Ray Anderson – trombone
 Craig Harris – trombone
 George Lewis – trombone
 Gary Valente – trombone

References

Ray Anderson (musician) albums
George E. Lewis albums
1995 albums
Hathut Records albums